Ḥarrat Lunayyir is a lava field in northwestern Saudi Arabia. In 2009 there were swarms of small earthquakes in the area; 2289 people were evacuated from the area. Fissures opened on the surface, and the area might now be considered volcanically active.

References

Rift volcanism
Volcanism of Saudi Arabia
Lava fields
Hejaz